Hayleigh Maree Brennan (born 5 March 1999) is an Australian cricketer. Born in Dandenong, a suburb of Melbourne, Victoria, she is a right-arm medium bowler. She has represented Victoria (2016/17–2017/18) and Middlesex (2018) in List A cricket. In the Women's Big Bash League (WBBL), she played for the Melbourne Stars during the 2017–18 season and the Perth Scorchers during the 2018–19 season.

Brennan played for Australia A against England Academy Women in April 2016.

References

External links
 
 

1999 births
Living people
Australian cricketers
Australian women cricketers
Cricketers from Melbourne
Melbourne Stars (WBBL) cricketers
Sportswomen from Victoria (Australia)
Victoria women cricketers
Middlesex women cricketers
Perth Scorchers (WBBL) cricketers
Australian expatriate sportspeople in England
Australian expatriate cricketers in the United Kingdom
People from Dandenong, Victoria